The Political Machine 2012 is a government simulation game from Stardock and the third game in The Political Machine series, in which the player leads a campaign to elect the President of the United States. The player accomplishes this goal by traveling from state to state and engaging in a variety of activities to either raise money or raise poll numbers.

Presidential candidates

Democrats
President Thomas Jefferson (DR-VA) (v1.02 update)
President John F. Kennedy (D-MA) (v1.02 update)
President Bill Clinton (D-AR) (v1.02 update)
President Barack Obama (D-IL)
Secretary of State Hillary Clinton (D-NY)
Vice President Al Gore (D-TN)

Republicans
President George Washington (VA) (v1.02 update)
President Abraham Lincoln (R-IL) (v1.02 update)
President Theodore Roosevelt (R-NY) (v1.02 update)
President Richard Nixon (R-CA) (v1.02 update)
President Ronald Reagan (R-CA) (v1.02 update)
Governor Mitt Romney (R-MA)

It is not possible to run as a third-party or independent candidate.

Reception

The game received "mixed" reviews according to video game review aggregator Metacritic.

References

External links
 Official website

2012 United States presidential election in popular culture
2012 video games
Cultural depictions of politicians
Cultural depictions of Abraham Lincoln
Cultural depictions of Barack Obama
Cultural depictions of Bill Clinton
Cultural depictions of George Washington
Cultural depictions of Hillary Clinton
Cultural depictions of Joe Biden
Cultural depictions of John F. Kennedy
Cultural depictions of presidents of the United States
Cultural depictions of Richard Nixon
Cultural depictions of Ronald Reagan
Cultural depictions of Theodore Roosevelt
Cultural depictions of Thomas Jefferson
Government simulation video games
Political satire video games
Satirical video games
Stardock games
Video games based on real people
Video games developed in the United States
Video games set in the United States
Windows games
Windows-only games
Multiplayer and single-player video games